The Michelsberg, at , is the highest point in the borough of Bad Münstereifel in the county of Euskirchen in the German state of North Rhine-Westphalia. The hill, which rises near the village of Mahlberg belongs to that part of the Eifel mountains known as the Ahr Hills (Ahreifel), and is the second highest point in the range.

Geography

Location 
The Michelsberg rises on the northwestern edge of the Ahr Hills in the High Fens-Eifel Nature Park. Its summit lies 1.2 km east-northeast of the centre of Mahlberg, which extends to the southwestern flank of the hill, and 1.5 km west-northwest of Reckerscheid. Some distance away to the south is the village of Esch with its hamlet of Wasserscheide. All these villages belong to the borough of Bad Münstereifel.

Natural regional classification 
The Michelsberg lies within the natural regional major unit group of East Eifel (Osteifel, no. 27) on the boundary of its southern subdivision, the Northern Ahr Hill Country (Nördliches Ahrbergland, 272.1) which belongs to the Ahr Eifel (Ahreifel, 272), with its northern subdivision, the Münstereifel Forest (Münstereifeler Wald, 274.1), which belongs to the major unit of Münstereifel Forest and Northeastern Foot of the Eifel (Münstereifeler Wald und Nordöstlicher Eifelfuß, 274). The western slopes of the hill drop into the subunit of the Münstereifel Valley (Münstereifeler Tal, 274.0).

Height and upland location 
According to a trig point marked on the German base map, the Michelsberg is 586.1 m. Its summit, whose height is also given as 588 m, is located on the middle of three tops or kuppen. From the main top, the countryside runs via a saddle at 564.6 m to the Michelsberg North Top, also called the Hohberg (574.5 m). To the southwest is another top, 573.5 m. In topographic maps of the Bundesamt für Naturschutz the summit region is also given a height of 566.1 m.

Rivers and watershed 
The watershed between the rivers Ahr and Erft runs over the Michelsberg. Among the rivers and streams that rise on or near the hill are: in the west the Schußbach, whose waters reach the Erft via the Waldbach which rises northwest of the hill. Flowing directly into the Erft in the same direction is the Krumesbach whose source lies to the south. Near its origin rises the Buchholzbach (Trinkpützsiefen, Escher Bach, Lamersbach) which sends its waters down the Armuthsbach south-southeastwards into the Ahr. The Liersbach (Rosensiefen) rises north of the hill and also flows southeastwards.

History 

Hunters and gatherers settled on and around the Michelsberg in early times, as evinced by numerous artefact finds (microliths etc.). Archaeologists date them to the Middle Stone Age (9,600 to 5,500/4,500 B. C.). Most of these artefacts are displayed in the Hürten Museum in Bad Münstereifel. In Celtic, Roman and Germanic times the hill was a pagan cultic and juridical site as its former name Mahlberg testifies. Until about 800 A.D. there were sacrificial fires (Opferfeuer) here. After the people adopted Christianity the pagan name was transferred to the nearby village of Mahlberg, while the hill was now consecrated to the Archangel Michael, the guardian of Christianity.

On the southwest flank of the hill is a transmission mast/-tower and, nearby, a water tank.

Pilgrimage 
The Michelsberg has been a destination for pilgrims for centuries as the make their traditional pilgrimage annually on 29 September. They make their way along a Way of Sorrows to the Roman Catholic Chapel of St. Michael at the summit.

Reserves 
Parts of the protected landscape (LSG) of the Mutscheid Upland (Mutscheider Hochfläche, CDDA no. 555558861; established 2008; 48.9083 km² in area) lie on the Michelsberg.  Another one, the LSG Fließgewässer, Auen und Hangbereiche im Bad Münstereifeler Tal (CDDA no. 555558740; 2008; 3.5523 km²) reaches up to its hillsides.

Hiking, transport, leisure 
The Michelsberg is often a destination for hikers and, is popular even when it snows because the grass-covered slopes are ideal for tobogganing and the paths in the vicinity of the hill are suitable for langlauf skiing. Running past the hill to the west is the Landesstraße 113 from Mahlberg to Scheuerheck) and, to the southeast, is the Kreisstraße 50 from Mahlberg to Reckerscheid.

From the viewing platform of the chapel tower there is an all-round view that reaches to the Siebengebirge hills, the basalt kuppen of the Hohe Acht, the Hochthürmerberg and Aremberg hills as well as the Schneifel and Rur Eifel regions. In good visibility even the towers on Cologne Cathedral, about 50 kilometres away, may be visible.

References

Literature 
 Jahrbuch Kreis Euskirchen 1988 – Zwei mesolithische Fundstellen im Kreis Euskirchen, Edgar Fass, Euskirchen, 1988
 Rheinisches Landesmuseum Bonn, Fundbericht Nr. 25 – 58500-5597500, dated 22 April 1983

External links 

 Geschichte des Michelsbergs und seiner Kapelle, at mahlberg.info

Mountains and hills of the Eifel
Euskirchen (district)
Mountains and hills of North Rhine-Westphalia